Lake Sárkány (Sárkány-tó, "Dragon Lake") is a lake in Hungary's Székesfehérvár sub-region.

Avian Population
The lakes area is home to birds such as the Avocet (Recurvirostra avosetta), Water Rail (Rallus aquaticus), Black-tailed Goldwit (Limosa limosa) and Sandpiper species.

References

Sarkany
Geography of Fejér County